Necopinatidae is a family of water bears or moss piglets, tardigrades in the class Eutardigrada.
It contains the following species in two genera
 Apodibius
 Apodibius confusus Dastych, 1983
 Apodibius nuntius Binda, 1986
 Apodibius richardi Vargha, 1995
 Apodibius serventyi Morgan & Nicholls 1986
 Necopinatum
 Necopinatum mirabile Pilato, 1971

References

External links

Parachaela
Tardigrade families
Polyextremophiles